Frémaux is a surname, derived from Germanic 'fram-wald'. Notable people with the surname include:

Eugene Wilton Frémaux (1887-1969), American businessman
Louis Frémaux (1921–2017), French conductor
Thierry Frémaux (born 1960), French film critic

References